George Edward Papp (January 20, 1916 – August 8, 1989) was an American comics artist best known as one of the principal artists on the long-running Superboy feature for DC Comics. Papp also co-created the Green Arrow character with Mort Weisinger and co-created Congo Bill with writer Whitney Ellsworth.

Career
George Papp began his comic book career with the occasional feature and cartoon in early issues of the Superman line of comics. "Pep Morgan" and "Clip Carson" were the first features he worked on for Action Comics. Papp's comics work was primarily for DC Comics but he briefly worked for Columbia Comics and Harvey Comics as well. He and writer Whitney Ellsworth created Congo Bill in More Fun Comics #56 (June 1940). Papp and Mort Weisinger co-created Green Arrow in More Fun Comics #73 (Nov. 1941). World War II interrupted Papp's comics career and he joined the U.S. Army. In 1946, Papp returned to DC Comics and drew the "Green Arrow" feature in both Adventure Comics and World's Finest Comics until 1958. He drew the "Superboy'" feature in Adventure Comics from 1958–1963 as well as the Superboy solo title until 1968. Bizarro's first comic book appearance, in Superboy #68 (Oct. 1958), was drawn by Papp. Robert Bernstein and Papp introduced the Phantom Zone and General Zod into the Superman mythos in Adventure Comics #283 (April 1961). His other work includes some of the early appearances of the Legion of Super-Heroes. He drew the Green Arrow character for the final time in The Brave and the Bold #71 (April–May 1967). Papp was fired by DC in 1968 along with many other prominent writers and artists who had made demands for health and retirement benefits. His final new work in the comics industry appeared in Superboy #148 (June 1968). He then worked in commercial art and advertising.

Bibliography

Columbia Comics
 Big Shot Comics #5–6 (1940)

DC Comics

 Action Comics #5, 7–11, 14, 16–18, 20, 22, 28–41 (1938–1941)
 Adventure Comics #34 ("Fantastic Facts" feature); #104–205, 207–249 ("Green Arrow" feature); #251, 254–255, 258–259, 261–262, 264–267, 269–270, 272–275, 277, 282–283, 287–290, 295, 297, 299–300, 303–310, 312–315 ("Superboy" feature); #320, 348, 358 ("Legion of Super-Heroes" feature) (1939–1967)
 All-American Men of War #11, 13–14, 22, 26, 28 (1954–1955)
 Batman #1–3, 16 ("Fantastic Facts" feature) (1940–1943)
 The Brave and the Bold #71 (Batman and Green Arrow) (1967)
 Congo Bill #4 (1955)
 Detective Comics #35, 37 ("Fantastic Facts" feature); #71 (1940–1943)
 Gang Busters #2–4, 7–8, 40, 61 (1948–1958)
 House of Mystery #26, 56, 61, 68, 70, 73 (1954–1958)
 House of Secrets #6, 8, 10 (1957–1958)
 Leading Comics #1–3, 5 (1941–1943)
 More Fun Comics #38; #52, 54–55 ("Fantastic Facts" feature); #56–67 ("Congo Bill" feature); #68–76 ("Clip Carson" feature); #73–84 ("Green Arrow" feature) (1938–1942)
 Mr. District Attorney #4, 57–58 (1948–1957)
 My Greatest Adventure #21 (1958)
 New York World's Fair Comics #2 ("Fantastic Facts" feature) (1940)
 Our Army at War #25–26, 31, 36, 44, 48 (1954–1956)
 Our Fighting Forces #1, 3, 6–7, 10–11 (1954–1956)
 Real Fact Comics #6, 8 (1947)
 Star Spangled Comics #91–105, 118 ("Captain Compass" feature) (1949–1951)
 Star Spangled War Stories #23, 30, 32 (1954–1955)
 Superboy #65–73, 75–79, 81, 83–97, 99–102, 104–128, 130–137, 139–142, 144–145, 148 (1958–1968)
 Superman #130, 152, 177 (1959–1965)
 Superman's Pal Jimmy Olsen #79–80, 82, 84, 86, 88, 90, 94 (1964–1966)
 Tales of the Unexpected #6, 9, 13–14, 27 (1956–1958)
 Tomahawk #48 (1957)
 World's Finest Comics #23, 25–95 ("Green Arrow" feature) (1946–1958)

Harvey Comics
 Champion Comics #2, 5 (1939–1940)
 Cyclone Comics #1, 3 (1940)

References

External links
 
 George Papp at Mike's Amazing World of Comics

1916 births
1989 deaths
20th-century American artists
Advertising artists and illustrators
United States Army personnel of World War II
American comics artists
Artists from New Jersey
Comics inkers
DC Comics people
Golden Age comics creators
People from Oradell, New Jersey
Silver Age comics creators